Duke Wu of Lu was a ruler of the State of Lu during the Western Zhou Dynasty. His ancestral name was Ji, and given name Ao. He succeeded his brother, Duke Shen of Lu, as the ninth ruler of Lu. 

In spring of the ninth year of his reign, he paid a visit to King Xuan of Zhou with his heir apparent Kuo and younger son, Xi. King Xuan appreciated Xi greatly, and despite the objections of his councillor Zhongshan Fu, he decided to intervene and appoint Xi as the heir apparent over his elder brother. In summer, the three returned to Lu, and Duke Wu died shortly after.

References

Monarchs of Lu (state)
9th-century BC Chinese monarchs
816 BC deaths